Estonia competed at the 2012 Winter Youth Olympics in Innsbruck, Austria. The Estonian team consisted of 17 athletes in 7 sports.

Medalists

Alpine skiing

Estonia qualified one boy and girl in alpine skiing.

Boy

Girl

Biathlon

Estonia qualified a full biathlon team of 2 boys and 2 girls.

Boys

Girls

Mixed

Cross country skiing

Estonia qualified one boy and girl.

Boy

Girl

Sprint

Mixed

Curling

Estonia qualified a mixed team.

Team
Skip: Robert Päll
Third: Marie Turmann
Second: Sander Rõuk
Lead: Kerli Zirk

Mixed Team

Draw 1

Draw 2

Draw 3

Draw 4

Draw 5

Draw 6

Draw 7

Mixed doubles

Round of 32

Round of 16

Figure skating

Estonia qualified three athletes (one ice dance couple and one girl singles athlete).

Mixed

Nordic combined 

Estonia qualified one boy athlete.

Boy

Ski jumping

Estonia qualified one boy athlete.

Boy

See also
Estonia at the 2012 Summer Olympics

References

2012 in Estonian sport
Nations at the 2012 Winter Youth Olympics
Estonia at the Youth Olympics